Joshua Frazier (born November 6, 1995) is an American football nose tackle and offensive lineman for the Massachusetts Pirates. He played college football at Alabama. He was drafted by the Pittsburgh Steelers in the seventh round of the 2018 NFL Draft.

College career 
On November 22, 2014, Frazier recorded a sack with his first-career tackle against Western Carolina. He recorded his second-career sack two years later against Washington on December 31, 2016. On October 7, 2017, he forced his first-career fumble against Texas A&M. Frazier played as a top backup in 2017 and recorded 15 tackles, 2.5 for loss, three pass break-ups and a forced fumble.

Professional career

Pittsburgh Steelers
The Pittsburgh Steelers drafted Frazier in the seventh round (246th overall) of the 2018 NFL Draft. On May 10, he signed his rookie contract. He was waived by the Steelers on September 1, 2018.

Detroit Lions
On December 12, 2018, Frazier was signed to the Detroit Lions practice squad.

Birmingham Iron
On January 9, 2019, Frazier was signed by the Birmingham Iron of the Alliance of American Football. He was placed on injured reserve on February 19. The league ceased operations in April 2019.

Retirement
Frazier tweeted his retirement from football in May 2019.

Orlando Guardians
Frazier came out of retirement in November 2022 and was drafted by the Orlando Guardians as an Offensive Lineman. He was released on January 20, 2022

Massachusetts Pirates
In February 2023 he signed with the Massachusetts Pirates from the Indoor Football League.

References

External links
Alabama Crimson Tide bio

1995 births
Living people
Players of American football from Arkansas
People from Springdale, Arkansas
American football defensive tackles
Alabama Crimson Tide football players
Pittsburgh Steelers players
Detroit Lions players
Birmingham Iron players